Coenococcus is a genus of green algae belonging to the family Radiococcaceae.

The species of this genus are found in Europe and Western Asia.

Species:

Coenococcus planctonicus

References

Sphaeropleales
Sphaeropleales genera